Transmembrane protease, serine 6 (also known as matriptase-2) is an enzyme that in humans is encoded by the TMPRSS6 gene.

The protein encoded by this gene is a type II transmembrane serine proteinase that is found attached to the cell surface. The encoded protein may be involved in matrix remodeling processes in the liver.

References

Further reading

Extracellular matrix remodeling enzymes